Manchester is an MBTA Commuter Rail station in Manchester-by-the-Sea, Massachusetts. Located in Downtown Manchester, it serves the Newburyport/Rockport Line. Although the official name is "Manchester", the station is signed as "Manchester by the Sea".

A small parking area is provided for local commuters. The station is accessible, with mini-high platforms at the outbound end of the platform.

History

The Gloucester Branch opened from Beverly to Manchester in August 1847. It was extended to Gloucester station in December 1847, and to Rockport in November 1861. The line later passed to the Eastern Railroad, which itself was absorbed by the Boston and Maine Railroad.

The original passenger station was replaced by a newer station in 1895. Neither survive, but the original freight house is present and used as a community center. West Manchester station, which was located on Boardman Street, was closed in early 1940. 

When the MBTA was formed in August 1964 to subsidize suburban commuter service, Manchester was the northeast limit of its funding district. On January 18, 1965, the Boston & Maine cut Gloucester Branch service back to Manchester. After Gloucester and Rockport reached funding deals to subsidize out-of-district operations, full service was returned to Rockport on June 28, 1965. The 1895-built station was demolished by 1977 and replaced by a laundromat.

References

External links

 MBTA - Manchester
 Station from Google Maps Street View

MBTA Commuter Rail stations in Essex County, Massachusetts
Stations along Boston and Maine Railroad lines